Comic Champ is a comics anthology magazine published by Daiwon C.I. in South Korea.  Below is a list of all titles serialized in the magazine and released under its book imprint, Champ Comics.  Titles are separated into domestic publications and translated works licensed from foreign publishing companies.

Domestic titles

1990s 
Comic Champ began in 1991 as Boy Champ (소년챔프) to complete with the already successful IQ Jump by Seoul Manhwasa. Comic Champ debuted with many popular manhwa series like Pagumki, about an emperor who gets his hands on a beyond powerful sword, and Rebirth about a man named Sang-Ho Do who ran a group of spiritual investigators.

2000s 
Boy Champ correctly changed its name to Comic Champ and had even more popular series that had their licence in the United States by Tokyopop.

Licensed titles
As well as there is manhwa in Comic Champ, it also has several manga. Most series come from the Shōnen manga magazines Weekly Shōnen Jump and Weekly Shōnen Sunday, and even two series from the Seinen (adult) magazine Ultra Jump.

1990's

2000's

References

Manhwa magazines
Lists of mass media in South Korea